Araucoxenia is a genus of crane fly in the family Limoniidae. There is only one known species.

Distribution
Chile

Species
Araucoxenia paradoxa Alexander, 1969

References

Limoniidae
Diptera of South America
Monotypic Diptera genera
Nematocera genera
Endemic fauna of Chile